World Cancer Day is an international day marked on :4 February to raise awareness of cancer and to encourage its prevention, detection, and treatment. World Cancer Day is led by the Union for International Cancer Control (UICC) to support the goals of the World Cancer Declaration, written in 2008. The primary goal of World Cancer Day is to significantly reduce illness and death caused by cancer and is an opportunity to rally the international community to end the injustice of preventable suffering from cancer. The day is observed by the United Nations.

World Cancer Day targets misinformation, raises awareness, and reduces stigma. Multiple initiatives are run on World Cancer Day to show support for those affected by cancer. One of these movements are #NoHairSelfie, a global movement to have "hairticipants" shave their heads either physically or virtually to show a symbol of courage for those undergoing cancer treatment. Images of participants are then shared all over social media.  Hundreds of events around the world also take place.

History
World Cancer Day was established on 4 February 2000 at the World Cancer Summit Against Cancer for the New Millennium, which was held in Paris.

The Charter of Paris Against Cancer, which was created to promote research, prevent cancer, improve patient services, also included an article establishing the anniversary of the document's official signing as World Cancer Day, was signed at the Summit by the then General Director of UNESCO, Kōichirō Matsuura, and then French President Jacques Chirac in Paris on 4 February 2000.

World Cancer Day themes 

The theme for the years 2022-2024 is 'Close the care gap' that focuses on eliminating the difference in access to cancer care services faced by populations of various groups of country income, age, gender, ethnicity etc.

The 2019-2021 campaign theme was 'I Am and I Will'. The theme seeks to counter the negative attitude and fatalistic belief that nothing can be done about cancer, and instead promotes how our personal actions can be powerful and impactful.

In 2016, World Cancer Day started a three-year campaign under the tagline of 'We can. I can.', which explored the power of collective and individual actions to reduce the impact of cancer. Prior to 2016, the campaign themes included "Not Beyond Us" (2015) and "Debunk the Myths" (2014).

Results

World Cancer Day is marked by the international cancer community, governments and individuals around the world. Each year, more than 900 activities take place in over 100 countries, with the day itself a trending topic on Twitter.

In recent years, cities have begun to support the day by lighting up important landmarks in orange and blue. In 2019, 55 landmarks in 37 cities participated in the landmark lighting initiative. At least 60 governments officially observe World Cancer Day.

See also 

 Breast Cancer Awareness Month (October in the United States)
 National Prostate Health Month (September in the United States)
 World Lymphoma Awareness Day (15 September)
 World Health Observances

References

External links

Union for International Cancer Control website
World Health Organization

United Nations days
Cancer awareness
Cancer
February observances
Cancer
International observances